The 2022 All-Pro teams were named by the Associated Press (AP), Pro Football Writers of America (PFWA), and The Sporting News (TSN) for performance in the 2022 NFL season. Any player selected to the first-team of any of the teams can be described as an "All-Pro." The AP team, with first-team and second-team selections, was chosen by a national panel of fifty NFL writers and broadcasters. The Sporting News All-NFL team was voted on by NFL players and executives. The PFWA team is selected by its more than 300 national members who are accredited media members covering the NFL.

Teams 

AP source:
PFWA source:
TSN source:

For this year's AP ballot, only Kansas City Chiefs tight end Travis Kelce and Minnesota Vikings wide receiver Justin Jefferson were unanimous selections, receiving all 50 first-place votes at their respective positions.

Key
AP = Associated Press first-team All-Pro
AP-2 = Associated Press second-team All-Pro
PFWA = Pro Football Writers Association All-NFL
TSN = The Sporting News All-Pro

Number of AP selections per team

Position differences

PFWA and TSN do not separate the tackles and guards into more specific positions as the AP does. Additionally, PWFA and TSN formally select defensive ends as opposed to edge rushers, while PFWA selects outside linebackers separately from middle linebackers.

References 

All-Pro Teams
Allpro